Norges Teknisk-naturvitenskapelige Universitets Idrettsforening, NTNUI, is the largest sports club in Norway with more than 10,000 members and a variety of participators on all levels of skills in more than 50 different sports. The athletic association is formally connected to the Norwegian University of Science and Technology located in Trondheim. The club has facilities at Dragvoll, Gløshaugen, Moholt and Solsiden.

The club was formed after the merge of several educational institutions in 1996, which resulted in the university NTNU. The largest of the merging sports clubs was NTHI.

NTNUI's cross-country skiing group is the sports club with the highest number of participants in the Norwegian ski marathon Birkebeinerrennet (170 participants in 2010).

Sports sections affiliated 
 Aikido
 American football
 Badminton
 Ball game and exercise
 Bandy
 Baseball
 Basketball
 Capoeira
 Climbing
 Cross-country skiing
 Cycling
 Dancing
 Diving
 Fencing
 Floorball (formerly separate teams for Dragvoll and Gløshaugen)
 Football
 Golf
 Gymnastics
 Handball Dragvoll
 Handball Gløshaugen
 Ice hockey
 Karate
 Lacrosse
 Orienteering
 Outdoor life
 Paddling
 Paintball
 Rowing
 Quidditch
 Rugby union
 Sailing
 Shooting
 Snowboard
 Softball/Baseball
 Squash
 Swimming
 Swing and folk dance
 Table tennis
 Taekwondo
 Tennis
 Tenshi Tsume
 Telemark and Alpine
 Track and field
 Triathlon
 Underwater rugby
 Volleyball Dragvoll
 Volleyball Gløshaugen
 Water polo
 Windsurfing
 Wing Chun

References

External links 
 NTNUI
 The Norwegian Association of University Sport

Sport in Trondheim
Norwegian University of Science and Technology
University and college sports clubs in Norway
Athletics clubs in Norway
Bandy clubs in Norway
Football clubs in Norway
Ice hockey teams in Norway
Norwegian volleyball clubs
Orienteering clubs in Norway
Association football clubs established in 1996
Bandy clubs established in 1996
1996 establishments in Norway